Martina Diesner-Wais (born 10 February 1968 in Waidhofen an der Thaya) is an Austrian politician (ÖVP). She was a member of the Austrian Federal Council from 2003 to 2013 and has been a member of the National Council since 2013.

Politics
Diesner-Wais was elected a member of the Schrems municipal council in 1990. Between 1995 and 2005 she was a city councilor, then again a councilor, and currently again a city councilor.

Diesner-Wais was sworn in as a member of the Federal Council on 24 April 2003 and was secretary of the Federal Council from 1 January 2006 to 30 June 2006. After the 2013 Austrian legislative election, Diesner-Wais moved from the Federal Council to the National Council. She was able to defend her mandate in the elections of 2017 and 2019.

Awards
 2014, Grand Decoration of Honour in Gold

References

Weblinks 

 
 Biographische Daten von Diesner-Wais at meineabgeordneten.at

1968 births
Living people
Members of the National Council (Austria)
Austrian People's Party politicians
People from Waidhofen an der Thaya District